The Kalewa Barracks is a military command station located in Ndola, Zambia. It was founded in 1963 and is one of the six major military stations in Zambia.

References

Barracks in Zambia
1963 establishments in Northern Rhodesia
Ndola